Thomas B. Pepinsky (born 1979) is an American academic of comparative politics and international political economy whose work focuses on Maritime Southeast Asia. He is the Walter F. LaFeber Professor of Government and Director of the Southeast Asia Program at Cornell University. Since 2018 Pepinsky has been a Nonresident Senior Fellow at the Brookings Institution.

Early life and education 
Pepinsky was born in 1979. He received a Bachelor of Arts in linguistics and international relations from Brown University in 2001 and completed his PhD in political science at Yale University in 2007. His wife is a musician who teaches and performs in Ithaca and New York.

Career 
From 2007 to 2008 Pepinsky was Assistant Professor of Political Science at the University of Colorado Boulder. He moved to Cornell University in 2008, where he has taught since. Since 2021 he has held the Walter F. LaFeber Professorship at Cornell.

Pepinsky serves as Executive Vice President of the Association for Analytical Learning on Islam and Muslim Societies and serves on the executive board of the Southeast Asian Research Group. He is fluent in Indonesian.

References

External links 

 

Living people
1979 births
American political scientists
Brown University alumni
Yale Graduate School of Arts and Sciences alumni
Cornell University faculty